Kilraghtis is a civil parish of County Clare, Ireland. 
It covers an area northeast of the town of Ennis, and includes the Ennis suburb of Roslevan.

Location

The parish of Kilraghtis is in the barony of Bunratty Upper.
In 1841 the population was 1,995 in 297 houses. The man hamlet at that time was Spancel-Hill.
The main road from Ennis to Galway runs through the parish.

Roman Catholic Church

History and antiquities

There are few antiquities of any interest in the parish. 
In 1893 the old church was very dilapidated. Nothing is known about the church or its patron.
There are no holy wells, and no significant raths or forts.

In 1559 the Battle of Spancel Hill was fought nearby, during a succession dispute in the O'Brien clan.

Townlands

The parish holds the townlands of Ballyduff,  Ballyline,  Ballymacahil,  Ballymaconna,  Ballyogan,  Bearnafunshin,  Cahernalough,  Cappagh Beg,  Cappagh More,  Carrowdotia,  Cloonkerry,  Cloontymurphy,  Cullenagh,  Curraderra,  Cragard,  Drumgloon,  Drumquin,  Drumgranagh,  Knockaluskraun,  Racorcraun,  Rosslevan,  Tooreen and Tullyvoghan.

The townland of Rosslevan is in the town of Ennis.

References
Citations

Sources

 

Civil parishes of County Clare